Conocybe aurea is a basidiomycete fungus in the family Bolbitiaceae.

Taxonomy
The fungus was first described to science in 1930 by German mycologist Julius Schäffer, who called it Galera aurea. Tsuguo Hongo transferred it to the genus Conocybe in 1963. In 2000, Anton Hausknecht published the variety C. aurea var. hololeuca, but this taxon is not considered to have independent taxonomic significance by Index Fungorum. The specific epithet aurea, meaning gold-coloured, refers to the fruitbody colour.

The species is related to Conocybe tenera.

Habitat and distribution
Conocybe aurea is a saprobic fungus that prefers to grow in nitrate-rich soils, fields, woodchip mulch, old compost, and greenhouses.  A rare but widespread species, it is found in Europe, Asia, North America, and South America.

Description
The cap is orangish yellow, and up to 5 cm in diameter. The gills and stipe are beige, the former browning with age.

Toxicity
The toxicity is unknown. Related species are known to be toxic.

Similar species
Conocybe apala is common, but with a whiter and more fragile conical cap.

References

External links

Bolbitiaceae
Fungi described in 1930
Fungi of Asia
Fungi of Europe
Fungi of North America
Fungi of South America